Philip Herbert may refer to:

Philip Herbert, 4th Earl of Pembroke (1584–1649), English courtier and politician
Philip Herbert, 5th Earl of Pembroke (1621–1669)
Philip Herbert, 7th Earl of Pembroke (1652/53–1683), English nobleman 
Philip Herbert (died 1716) (c. 1665–1716), Member of Parliament for Rye, 1705–1707
Philip Herbert (died 1749) (c. 1716–1749), Member of Parliament for Oxford, 1740–1749
Philip Herbert (actor) (born 1957), English actor and mime artist
Philip Herbert (composer) British composer